Weekend with Velez is a Philippine television news magazine show broadcast by GMA Network. Hosted by Jose Mari Velez, it premiered in 1986. The show concluded in 1987. It was replaced by Velez This Week in its timeslot.

References 

1986 Philippine television series debuts
1987 Philippine television series endings
GMA Network original programming
GMA Integrated News and Public Affairs shows
Philippine documentary television series